The Kalemouth Suspension Bridge is a suspension bridge at Kalemouth in the Scottish Borders area of Scotland, near the B6401. It crosses the River Teviot just above its confluence with the Kale Water, near Eckford.

History
It was designed by Captain Samuel Brown (1776-1852), an officer of the Royal Navy, and built by William Mather, a contractor of Kalemouth, some time between 1820 and 1830. Alexander Jeffrey wrote in 1838 "there is a chain bridge erected over the Tweed (sic) by the Late Mr Ormiston of that Ilk, at his own expense, for his private use: but it has since been opened to the public for a trifling fee - a boon which cannot easily be forgot or misused." In 1834, the tolls were ½d. for a foot passenger, 3d. for a horse or cart, 6d. for a gig, and 1s. for a chaise. Tolls are thought to have been paid at Kalemouth Cottage, now enlarged and a private home. Another source give the name of the person who paid for the bridge as William Mein of Ormiston.

It is protected as a Category A listed building.

The bridge is  still in use as an unclassified public road bridge, and is one of the earliest surviving carriage suspension bridges.

Design
It crosses the River Teviot just above its confluence with the Kale Water, near Eckford. There is another nearby bridge called the Kalemouth Bridge, which carries the A698 over the Kale Water.

The bridge works on the principle of suspension, and uses chains with long iron links for the suspension cables. Iron rods are used for suspenders to connect the chain to the deck of the bridge, and additional suspenders have been added in the middle of the chain links. A red painted wooden truss supports the wooden deck, which is covered with a layer of asphalt. The four ashlar pylons at the ends of the bridge are of pyramidal form.

References

External links

Bridges in the Scottish Borders
Suspension bridges in the United Kingdom
Category A listed buildings in the Scottish Borders
Listed bridges in Scotland
Former toll bridges in Scotland